Pavel Zubíček (born 21 October 1974) is a Czech professional ice hockey defenceman who currently plays with HC Kometa Brno in the Czech Extraliga.

Zubíček previously played for HC Vsetín, HC České Budějovice and HC Hamé Zlín.

References

External links
 
 

Czechoslovak ice hockey defencemen
Czech ice hockey defencemen
HC Kometa Brno players
VHK Vsetín players
PSG Berani Zlín players
Motor České Budějovice players
Ice hockey people from Brno
Living people
1974 births